Peter van Heeren is a Norwegian crime film from 1957. It is based on Alf Bonnevie Bryn's debut crime novel, Peter van Heeren tar skeen i den anden haand (Peter van Heeren Holds His Spoon in His Other Hand). The novel was adapted for film by Sigval Maartmann-Moe, who also directed the film.

Plot
The film is about the rich, eccentric, and amiable idler Peter van Heeren (played by Per Skift) and his many companies. He is persuaded to help his friend, Mrs. Kathie Winter (Liv Wilse), who is exposed to a certain appellate court attorney Halmer, who tries to win her favor though blackmail and other unorthodox methods. Peter van Heeren receives help from his inimitable butler Jeremias (Ernst Diesen).

Cast

 Per Skift as Peter van Heeren
 Liv Wilse as Käthie Winther
 Ernst Diesen as Jeremias, van Heeren's butler
 Knut M. Hansson as Halmer
 Ola Isene as the police chief
 Helge Essmar as the director
 Willie Hoel as a close friend of van Heeren
 Per Lillo-Stenberg as a friend of van Heeren
 Lillebil Nordrum as Miss Lyng
 Leif Enger as an auctioneer
 Erik Melbye Brekke as a night-shift worker
 Dan Fosse as a criminal
 Per Theodor Haugen as an office clerk
 Aud Schønemann as a customer
 Gustav-Adolf Hegh as a car rental employee
 Odd Borg as a taxi driver
 Tore Ween as a jeweler
 Berit Kullander as a spectator

References

External links
 
 Peter van Heeren at Filmfront
 Peter van Heeren at the National Library of Norway

1957 films
Norwegian crime films
Norwegian black-and-white films
Films directed by Sigval Maartmann-Moe